The Brain Tumour Charity is a UK-based, Charity Commission registered, charity dedicated to funding research, raising awareness of brain tumours, reducing diagnosis times and providing support and information for people with brain tumours, their families and friends.

In 2015 the charity published its new five year strategy 'Defeating Brain Tumours'.

The charity's goals are to double survival of a brain tumour diagnosis within 10 years in the UK, and to halve the harm that brain tumours have on quality of life.

History
The Brain Tumour Charity, as it is today, was created after the merging of Brain Tumour UK, Samantha Dickson Brain Tumour Trust and the Joseph Foote Trust in 2013.

The Samantha Dickson Brain Tumour Trust was started by Neil and Angela Dickson  in 1996, who lost their daughter, Samantha, to a brain tumour when she was 16 years old. They had become aware of the lack of properly funded research into this cancer and were determined to try and remedy the situation.

Andy Foote founded The Joseph Foote Fund in 2007 after losing his son, Joseph, to a brain tumour. The Foote family began raising funds for research into the causes and treatment of brain tumours – in its 12-year history The Joseph Foote Trust raised more than £2 million.In 1997, the UK Brain Tumour Society was founded, which later became Brain Tumour UK.The Brain Tumour Charity has grown rapidly since the merging, funding a diverse portfolio of research programmes, projects and clinical trials across the UK.

Activities

Research and research funding 
The Brain Tumour Charity currently fund a portfolio of research across the UK with the aim of doubling survival and reducing long term harm through improving the understand and complexities of brain tumours, better diagnostic techniques and new treatments.

To achieve these goals, the charity focuses efforts on five priority areas that the charity believes will have the biggest effect for those affected, reflected in its five-year research strategy, 'A Cure Can't Wait':
 Accelerate – biobanking to accelerate research progress through centralised collection of, and access to, brain tumour tissue samples.
 Diagnose – diagnosing brain tumours earlier and more accurately for both children and adults.
 Understand – increasing understanding of the genetics and biology of tumour development to identify effective new treatments.
 Catalyse – translating laboratory discoveries into new and effective treatments that increase survival and quality of life.
 Enhance – enhancing care and quality of life for everyone affected by a brain tumour, including patients and carers.

The charity works, has worked, and continues to work with a number of medical and research institutes, laboratories and universities looking for cures to defeat brain tumours, as well as treatments for both adults and children.

They also provide funding opportunities in line with the 'A Cure Can't Wait' strategy, and award these following competitive peer reviewing processes and assessments made by their independent Grant Review and Monitoring Committee (GRAM).

Support and Information services 
The Brain Tumour Charity is the only national brain tumour charity to provide a variety of information and support services which allow people personally affected by brain tumours to access support online, face to face, on the phone or in printed form across the UK, regardless of tumour type, age or location, for both adults and children.

The services are focused on improving life today, helping people to live their life well, with improved quality of life.

The charity's support and information services are available free of charge for everyone affected by a brain tumour, those who have been diagnosed, as well as their family, friends, schools and employers.

Raising awareness, policies and campaigns

HeadSmart 
The Brain Tumour Charity's primary awareness campaign is HeadSmart: be brain tumour aware. HeadSmart  is a multi-award-winning, UK-wide campaign based on research funded by The Brain Tumour Charity at The University of Nottingham (2003-2006).

HeadSmart aims to educate the public and healthcare professionals about the signs and symptoms of brain tumours in children and young people, to reduce diagnosis times, to save lives and to reduce long term disability. The campaign's goal is to reduce diagnosis times to four weeks or less in line with NHS targets.

Raising awareness of brain tumours 
The charity campaigns on a range of issues that affect people affected by a brain tumour. They engage with politicians, policy makers and other influential stakeholders within the health sector, including responding to government consultations. The charity also works with like-minded organisations and networks across the UK to better understand local healthcare issues.

In 2015 the charity commissioned a research project 'Living with a brain tumour', in partnership with an independent research agency. The research investigated the lived experience of adults with a brain tumour. Two publications have results from the research:
 'Losing Myself: The Reality of Life with a Brain Tumour' – this report demonstrated the extensive effect that brain tumours have on the daily lives of those affected.
 'Finding Myself in Your Hands: The Reality of Brain Tumour Treatment and Care' – this report outlined the findings related to respondents' experiences of their NHS treatment and care.

Manifestos 
Ahead of the 2015 general elections, The Brain Tumour Charity released a manifesto on brain tumours. It outlined key measures that could help survival outcomes and quality of life for everyone affected by brain tumours in the UK.

The charity have also released manifestos ahead of the devolved nation elections in 2016.

Fundraising events 
People take part in fundraising events across the UK. Flagship events for The Brain Tumour Charity include The Twilight Walk and #WearItOut for Bandanas for Brain Tumour Awareness Month (every March), which also help to unite the brain tumour community.

Partnerships 
The Brain Tumour Charity collaborates with a number of other organisations, including Cancer Research UK, Marie Curie Cancer Care Medical Research Council, Children with Cancer UK, Action Medical Research, and Great Ormond Street Hospital.

They have also worked in partnership with Peak, a mobile brain training app.

Institutions that they have funded include Imperial College London, Institute of Cancer Research, Newcastle University, the University of Nottingham, Queen Mary University of London, University of Birmingham, University College London, University of Glasgow and University of Leeds.

See also 
 Cancer in the United Kingdom

References

External links
 Official website
 HeadSmart campaign website

Biomedical research foundations
Cancer organisations based in the United Kingdom
Farnborough, Hampshire
Health charities in the United Kingdom
Health in Hampshire
Neurology organizations
Organisations based in Hampshire
Organizations for children with health issues